The 2020 season was the 13th season for the Indian Premier League franchise Kings XI Punjab. They were one of the eight teams that competed in the 2020 Indian Premier League. The Kings XI Punjab's catchment areas are Kashmir, Jammu, Himachal Pradesh, Punjab and Haryana—evident from the letter sequence "K J H P H" in the banner of the team's logo. Kings XI Punjab finished the tournament in 6th position with 6 wins and 8 losses failing to qualify for the playoffs.

Background

Player retention and transfers 

The Kings XI Punjab retained 14 players and released seven players. On 7 November 2019, KXIP traded Ravichandran Ashwin to Delhi Capitals for Rs 1.5 crore and Karnataka spinner Jagadeesha Suchith, ending a series of intense negotiations over the Indian spinner's IPL future. Later in the year they traded Ankit Rajpoot to Rajasthan Royals in return for Krishnappa Gowtham.

Retained KL Rahul, Karun Nair, Mohammed Shami, Nicholas Pooran, Mujeeb ur Rahman, Chris Gayle, Mandeep Singh, Mayank Agarwal, Hardus Viljoen, Darshan Nalkande, Sarfaraz Khan, Arshdeep Singh, Harpreet Brar and Murugan Ashwin.

Released Varun Chakravarthy, Andrew Tye, Sam Curran, Simran Singh, David Miller, Moises Henriques and Agnivesh Ayachi.

Auction

KXIP went in the auction with a purse of 42.70 Cr INR which was higher than any other team. KXIP had 16 players in front of the IPL 2020 Auction, and their significant hole was the all-rounders players. For that, KXIP purchased Glenn Maxwell for an incredible INR 1075L, and James Neesham and Deepak Hooda for just INR 50L. Their other costly purchases incorporate Sheldon Cottrell and Chris Jordan for INR 850L and INR 300L separately.

Players bought: Glenn Maxwell, Deepak Hooda, James Neesham, Prabhsimran Singh, Chris Jordan, Tanjinder Dhillon, Ravi Bishnoi, Ishan Porel, Sheldon Cottrell.

Team Analysis
ESPNcricinfo wrote "Kings XI Punjab ensured that their playing eleven was completed By purchasing Glenn Maxwell and Sheldon Cottrell. On paper, this team's potential playing eleven looks very strong. The weak side of this team is its bench strength and bowling attack. Though Punjab had a lot of money left and the team could buy more players, but the team did not do so. The team also had the option of buying an opener as a backup for Gayle. Or by bidding higher for Chris Morris in the auction, the team could have added him as well."

Indian Premier League
On 20 September, the Kings XI started their season campaign. KL Rahul, the kings' new captain, elected to field first. This thrilling match ended in a tie. Delhi started with a win in the tournament, defeating Punjab's team in the Super Over. Delhi scored 157-run with the loss of 8 wickets in 20 overs. Team had lost early wickets, but Marcus Stoinis"s brilliant innings helped the Delhi Capitals to build a 157-run target.  In response to 158 runs, Punjab also scored 157-run in 20 overs on Mayank Agarwal's knock of 89 runs.

On 24 September, Kings XI Punjab won their first match of the season defeating Royal Challlangers Banglore by 97-run. KL Rahul lost the toss and was put to bat. Rahul and Mayank Agarwal build the Kings XI innings with a 57-run stand for the first wicket. Rahul scored 132 off 69 balls with 14 fours and 7 sixes and helped the Kings XI finish the innings at 206/3 in 20 overs. Chasing a target of 207, the Royal Challlangers had lost three wickets in a first four overs. Kings XI new ball pair of Sheldon Cottrell and Mohammed Shami continued their good work from the first match and Royal Challengers were eventually bowled out for 109. Rahul became the fastest Indian batsman to complete 2000 runs in IPL. However,they were ousted against Rajasthan Royals who successfully chased down 223 and then continued to lose five matches.The losing streak was broken when Punjab defeated Bangalore for 2nd time and then defeated Mumbai Indians in the Super Over and continued to win three more matches against Delhi,Hyderabad and Kolkata. However,they lost two matches at the end of the tournament.Their last match was against Chennai Super Kings who won comprehensively by 9 wickets,therefore knocking Punjab out of the tournament.

Preseason
In February 2020, KPH Dream Cricket Private Limited, they has purchased the Caribbean Premier League team St Lucia Zouks. They become the second owners of IPL to run a CPL team, the first one is Red Chillies Entertainment, who own both Kolkata Knight Riders and Trinbago Knight Riders.

offseason
On 13 March 2020, the BCCI postponed the tournament until 15 April, in view of the ongoing coronavirus pandemic. On 14 April 2020, Narendra Modi said that the lockdown in India would last until at least 3 May 2020, with the tournament postponed further. The following day, the BCCI suspended the tournament indefinitely due to the pandemic.

On 17 May 2020, the Indian government relaxed nation-wide restrictions on sports events, allowing events to take place behind closed doors. On 24 May, Indian sports minister Kiren Rijiju stated that the decision on whether or not to allow the tournament to be conducted in 2020 will be made by the Indian government based on "the situation of the pandemic". In June 2020, the BCCI confirmed that their preference was to host the tournament in India, possibly between September and October.
On 24 July 2020, it was confirmed that the tournament would start from 19 September 2020.

 Squad 
 Players with international caps are listed in bold.

 Administration and support staff 

Kit manufacturers and sponsors

Teams and standings
 Results by match 

League table

League stage

Statistics
 Most runs 

 Source: ESPN CricinfoMost wickets

 Source: ESPN Cricinfo'

Player of the match awards

References

Punjab Kings seasons
2020 Indian Premier League